Robitashvili is a surname from Georgia, formerly of a noble family. 

The Robitashvili had the title of tavadi (prince) in the Kingdom of Kakheti and were included in the list of the Georgian nobility attached to the Russo-Georgian treaty of Georgievsk of 1783. After the Russian annexation of Georgia, the family was confirmed among the princely nobility (knyaz) of the Russian Empire in 1850. The surname was Russified as Robitov. 

The Robitashvili had no officially confirmed coat of arms, but a drawing of the familial arms is included in Tsikhinsky's unpublished Russian-language catalogue The Caucasian Armorial, dated to 1922.

References

Noble families of Georgia (country)
Russian noble families
Georgian-language surnames